Juan Maldonado Jaimez Júnior (born 6 February 1982), simply known as Juan, is a Brazilian footballer who played as a left-back. He also holds an EU passport as a Spanish citizen.

Club career

Arsenal
Juan was born in São Paulo. He started his career with São Paulo before being signed by English side Arsenal in 2001. He only made two first-team appearances for Arsenal, his debut coming against Grimsby Town in the League Cup on 27 November 2001. His other appearance came when he started in the 5th Round of the FA Cup against Gillingham on 16 February 2002. Juan was due to play in Arsenal's Third Round League Cup tie against Sunderland but picked up a knee injury ahead of the game. He also scored in a pre-season friendly for Arsenal against Stevenage in 2002. On 8 November 2002, additional diagnosis confirmed an ACL knee injury. This injury essentially ended Juan's Arsenal career.

Millwall
He had a brief period on loan for two months at Millwall in 2003. There he played three league matches and one League Cup match.

Fluminense

Flamengo
Juan moved to Flamengo in the beginning of 2006. Late in that year he scored one goal in the final of Brazilian Cup against Vasco da Gama and was named "man of the match".

After being voted one of the best players in the Brazilian Série A 2007, Juan received the second place prize Bola de Prata (Silver Ball) award for best left back awarded by Placar, a prestigious Brazilian football magazine. Juan played well once again in the 2008 season, this time winning the Bola de Prata (Silver Ball) award as the best player in his position.

On 22 August 2008, Juan received his first call up to Brazil national team to play against Chile and Bolivia in the qualifying round of the World Cup 2010. After this spell with the national team Juan was occasionally referred to as Juan Maldonado to avoid confusion with Juan, another former Flamengo player who had also been called up for Brazil around this time.

On 22 May 2009, Juan received a 30-day ban for threatening Botafogo's Maicosuel in the 2009 Rio de Janeiro State League finals.

São Paulo
In December 2010, as his Flamengo contract was expiring, São Paulo announced interest in signing the player. Juan declared that a return to São Paulo, the club where he played as a youth player before joining Arsenal, would be "like moving home." Juan joined São Paulo at the start of 2011 season. After the finish of his loan for Santos, Juan, that was out of Ney Franco's plans, didn't back to club.

Santos
In February 2012 Juan joined Santos FC on a season long loan after São Paulo signed left back Cortês from Botafogo. The move has worked out well with Juan playing regularly and helping his side win the 2012 São Paulo State Championship.

Return to São Paulo
In May 2013, after the reorganisation made by president Juvenal Juvêncio and coach Ney Franco, which got rid of seven players, Juan was reintegrated to Tricolor. In the Juvêncio's words: "O rapaz [Juan] chegou impecável e disposto a jogar" ("The boy [Juan] came with a flawless form and wishing to play"). The next month, Juan made his début against Atlético Mineiro in the Brazilian League. Juan came on from the bench as a substitute for Thiago Carleto, who came off injured. According to Juan: "Estou muito feliz de poder defender o São Paulo novamente."("I am very happy to defend São Paulo again").

On 5 June 2013, Juan made his full début for São Paulo. The game finished 1–0 to Goiás, and the player was criticized by fans. According to Juan he did not understand the claims: "Quando o resultado não vem, sobra para alguém. Mais uma vez, sobrou para mim. Queria entender qual o problema da torcida comigo. Eu me esforço, luto. Sei que não estou 100%, que eu posso render mais, mas time grande é assim, tem pressão" ("When we could not win, somebody always is faulted. One more time, I was the faulted. I would want to understand which the fans' problems with me. I try, I fight. I know I am not 100% conditioned, that I can play better, but in great club the things are this way, under pressure").

Vitória
On 30 August 2013, Juan was presented in Esporte Clube Vitória. He chose the side from Bahia because of Caio Júnior, with whom he worked at CR Flamengo, a period during which Juan made it into the Brazilian team. Ironically, with Júnior dismissed, Juan would work again with Ney Franco, the coach that, in the start of 2013, did not have Juan in his plans when both of them were at São Paulo FC. Juan scored his first goal on 4 September, in a 2–1 loss against Flamengo.

On 5 October 2013, in the 3–2 loss against São Paulo, Juan scored a goal against his former club and was heavily scolded by Tricolor fans. His goal was also criticized by Rogério Ceni, São Paulo's captain, who said Juan kicked the ball with both feet, which is prohibited in football.

Retirement
On 16 August 2019, 37-year old Juan announced his retirement from football.

International career
Juan debuted in the Brazil national team on 7 September 2008 as a second-half substitute replacing Ronaldinho in the 2010 World Cup Qualifiers 3–0 win over Chile. Three days later, he played his first match as a starter against Bolivia in Estádio Olímpico João Havelange, also for the 2010 World Cup Qualifiers.

Career statistics

Club

International

Honours

Club
Arsenal
FA Cup: 2002

Fluminense
Taça Guanabara: 2005
Campeonato Carioca: 2005

Flamengo
Copa do Brasil: 2006
Taça Guanabara: 2007, 2008
Taça Rio: 2009
Campeonato Carioca: 2007, 2008, 2009
Campeonato Brasileiro Série A: 2009

Santos
Campeonato Paulista: 2012
Recopa Sudamericana: 2012

Individual
 Campeonato Brasileiro Série A Team of the Year: 2008
 Bola de Prata: 2008

References

External links
 
 
 

1982 births
Living people
Footballers from São Paulo
Brazilian footballers
Association football defenders
Association football midfielders
Campeonato Brasileiro Série A players
Campeonato Brasileiro Série B players
São Paulo FC players
Fluminense FC players
CR Flamengo footballers
Santos FC players
Esporte Clube Vitória players
Coritiba Foot Ball Club players
Goiás Esporte Clube players
Avaí FC players
Centro Sportivo Alagoano players
Tombense Futebol Clube players
Boavista Sport Club players
English Football League players
Arsenal F.C. players
Millwall F.C. players
Brazil international footballers
Brazilian expatriate footballers
Brazilian expatriate sportspeople in England
Expatriate footballers in England